Hazel Rose Newhook  (December 24, 1914 – June 26, 2016) was a Canadian politician, who sat in the Newfoundland House of Assembly from 1979 to 1985 as a member of the Progressive Conservatives. where she represented the electoral district of Gander.  She also served as mayor of Gander from 1973 to 1977.

Newhook and her caucus colleague Lynn Verge were appointed to the Executive Council of Newfoundland by Premier Brian Peckford in 1979, becoming the first two women ever to serve in the provincial cabinet. She was awarded the Order of Newfoundland and Labrador in 2009. She turned 100 in December 2014 and died on June 26, 2016 at the age of 101.

References

1914 births
2016 deaths
Mayors of Gander, Newfoundland and Labrador
Members of the Executive Council of Newfoundland and Labrador
Progressive Conservative Party of Newfoundland and Labrador MHAs
Women MHAs in Newfoundland and Labrador
Members of the Order of Newfoundland and Labrador
Women mayors of places in Newfoundland and Labrador
Canadian centenarians
Women government ministers of Canada
Women centenarians
20th-century Canadian politicians
20th-century Canadian women politicians